The Russian Orthodox Cathedral of the Most Holy Trinity is an Eastern Orthodox church building in Buenos Aires, Argentina. Located in the neighborhood of San Telmo, in front of Lezama Park.

History 
In front of the Argentine National Historical Museum, is this structure, designed in Saint Petersburg by the architect of the Holy Synod of Russia, Mikhail Preobrazensky, started in 1898, and finally built and adapted in 1901, and honorably, by the Norwegian architect (based in Argentina) Alejandro Christophersen, in collaboration with the engineer Pedro Coni. The funds for its construction were donated by Russia.

It is currently an Argentine National Historic Monument.

Structure 
Neo-Byzantine Architecture and Neo-Russian Style

The church consists of a plot of 2352 ft and 53 ft wide (716.6 m2 and 16 m) by 144 ft deep (44 m).

It is in a remarkable 17th-century Russian style, with five blue Onion domes and golden stars, crowned by Orthodox crosses attached with chains pointing to the east.

On its sides you can see two murals, one called "Baptism of Russia" and another with motifs about the Theotokos, Jesus and Saint John.

Finally, on the front, a bronze bas-relief reproduces the facade of the church.

The temple is on the second floor of the structure, and it is accessed through a richly decorated door to the left of the facade. Its altar is intentionally oriented towards the east, it also has several icons, highlighting among all the one dedicated to the Holy Trinity, which gives the church its name. To the left of the altar, is the space for the choir.

See also
 Russian Orthodox Church in Argentina
 Russians in Argentina

References

External links

Buildings and structures in Buenos Aires
Cathedrals in Argentina
Cathedrals in Buenos Aires
Churches completed in 1901
Eastern Orthodox church buildings in Argentina
European-Argentine culture in Buenos Aires
Russian diaspora in South America
Russian Orthodox cathedrals
Russian Orthodox Church Outside of Russia
Russian Revival architecture